{{Infobox gymnast
| name           = Gabby Douglas
| image          = Gabby Douglas 2016 Summer Olympics Gold Medal.jpg
| image_size     = 
| caption        = Douglas at the 2016 Olympic Games
| full_name      = Gabrielle Christina Victoria Douglas
| nickname       = Gabby
| country        =  United States
| birth_date     = 
| birth_place    = Newport News, Virginia
| hometown       = Virginia Beach, Virginia
| residence      = Los Angeles, California
| height         = 5 ft 3 in
| discipline     = WAG
| level          = Senior international elite
| natlteam       = 2008–2012, 2014–2016 (USA)
| gym            = WOGA (current)Buckeye GymnasticsChow's Gymnastics
| collegeteam    = 
| headcoach      = Valeri Liukin
| formercoach    = Christian GallardoKittia CarpenterDena WalkerGustavo MoureLiang Chow
| retired        =
| choreographer  =
| music          = 
| show-medals    = yes
| medaltemplates = 

}}

Gabrielle Christina Victoria Douglas (born December 31, 1995) is an American artistic gymnast. She is the 2012 Olympic all around champion and the 2015 World all-around silver medalist. She was a member of the gold-winning teams at both the 2012 and the 2016 Summer Olympics, dubbed the "Fierce Five" and the "Final Five" by the media, respectively. She was also a member of the gold-winning American teams at the 2011 and the 2015 World Championships.

Douglas is the first African American to become the Olympic individual all-around champion, and the first U.S. gymnast to win gold in both the individual all-around and team competitions at the same Olympics. She was also the 2016 AT&T American Cup all-around champion.

As a public figure, Douglas' gymnastics successes have led to her life story adaptation in the 2014 Lifetime biopic film, The Gabby Douglas Story, as well as the acquisition of her own reality television series, Douglas Family Gold. Douglas has also written a book about her life and what it takes to be an Olympic gold medalist by determination and perseverance.

Early life

Douglas was born in Newport News, Virginia and grew up in nearby Virginia Beach, to parents Timothy Douglas and Natalie Hawkins-Douglas. She has two older sisters, Arielle and Joyelle, and one older brother, Johnathan. She began training in gymnastics at age six when her sister convinced their mother to enroll her in classes. In October 2002, she began her training at Gymstrada.

At the age of eight, Douglas won the Level 4 all-around gymnastics title at the 2004 Virginia State Championships.

At 14, she moved to Des Moines, Iowa, to train full-time with coach Liang Chow. Because her family had to stay in Virginia while her siblings finished school, she lived with Travis and Missy Parton and their four daughters, one of whom also trained at Chow's gym. However, Douglas struggled to fit in because of the separation from her family and hometown.

Douglas is Christian; she said, "I believe in God. He is the secret of my success. He gives people talent", and "I love sharing about my faith. God has given me this amazing God-given talent, so I'm going to go out and glorify His name." Douglas has also stated in her biography that when she was younger her "family practiced some of the Jewish traditions", including attending a Conservative Jewish synagogue, keeping kosher, and celebrating Hanukah.

 Junior career 

2008

Douglas made her international debut in 2008 at the US Classic in Houston, Texas, where she placed 10th place in the all-around rankings. She went on to compete at the 2008 Visa Championships in Boston, Massachusetts. Placing 16th in that competition, Douglas was not eligible for the 2008 Junior Women's National Team.

2009
In 2009, Douglas suffered a fracture in the growth plate of her wrist. Due to this injury, she was not able to compete and missed the 2009 Covergirl US Classic.  While she competed at the 2009 Visa Championships in Dallas, Texas, Douglas was unable to perform her full routines and competed only on balance beam and floor exercise.

2010
Douglas competed at the 2010 Nastia Liukin Supergirl Cup, a televised Level 10 meet held in Worcester, Massachusetts, where she placed fourth all-around.

Her first elite meet was the 2010 CoverGirl Classic in Chicago, Illinois, where Douglas placed third on balance beam, 6th on vault, and 9th all-around in the junior division.

At the 2010 U.S. Junior National Championships, Douglas won the silver medal on balance beam, placed fourth all-around and on vault, and tied for eighth on floor exercise.

At the 2010 Pan American Championships in Guadalajara, Mexico, Douglas won the uneven bars title, and she won a share of the U.S. team gold medal. She also placed fifth all-around.

In October, at age 14, Douglas moved into the home of Missy Parton in West Des Moines, Iowa, to train under Liang Chow, the former coach of 2007 World Champion and 2008 Summer Olympics gold medalist Shawn Johnson. Although Douglas' former coach, Walker, stated in 2012 that she was convinced Douglas could have made it to the Olympics if she had remained in Virginia Beach, Douglas said, "Something clicked in my head that said, if I really want to make this happen I need to get better coaching."  The impetus for Douglas' move to Iowa was when Walker had invited Chow to teach a clinic at her gym, Excalibur. Douglas was impressed when Chow was able to teach her how to perform the Amanar vault in a single afternoon. Douglas considered a move to Texas to train with a renowned coach there, but after that coach declined to train her out of loyalty to Walker, Douglas selected Chow. Chow was initially skeptical, since Douglas had been just one of hundreds of children at the clinic in Virginia Beach. However, Chow subsequently informed Douglas's Excalibur coaches that he had agreed to train her, but pointed out that he did not recruit her, saying, "I would never recruit anybody to my program." Later on, Douglas suffered from a hamstring strain and a hip flexor injury in July. She couldn't do much during this time, but this allowed her to improve her bar skills.

 Senior career 
2011
At the City of Jesolo Trophy in Italy, Douglas was part of the US team that won gold. She also placed second on floor, tied for third on beam, and placed fourth in the all-around and on vault.

Douglas earned the silver medal in uneven bars at the CoverGirl Classic in Chicago.

At the 2011 U.S. National Championships in St. Paul, Minnesota, Douglas tied for third on bars and placed seventh all-around.

At the 2011 World Championships in Tokyo, Japan, Douglas shared in the team gold medal won by the U.S. Douglas also placed fifth in uneven bars.

2012

At the AT&T American Cup at Madison Square Garden in March, Douglas received the highest total all-around score in the women's competition, ahead of her teammate and current world champion Jordyn Wieber. However, her scores did not count towards winning the competition because she was an alternate.

Later in March, she was part of the gold-winning U.S. team at the Pacific Rim Championships, where she also won gold in uneven bars.
At the 2012 U.S. National Championships in June, Douglas won the gold medal in uneven bars, silver in the all-around, and bronze in floor. Márta Károlyi, the National Team Coordinator for USA Gymnastics, nicknamed Douglas the "Flying Squirrel" for her aerial performance on the uneven bars.

2012 Summer Olympics
At the 2012 Olympic Trials held in San Jose, California on July 1, Douglas placed first in the all-around rankings, securing the only guaranteed spot on the women's Olympic gymnastic team.

At the 2012 Summer Olympics gymnastics event at the O2 Arena (North Greenwich Arena) in London, Douglas and her teammates – Jordyn Wieber, McKayla Maroney, captain Aly Raisman and Kyla Ross (collectively nicknamed the "Fierce Five")  – won the team event gold medal at the 2012 Summer Olympics. They were the first to do so since the "Magnificent Seven"'s victory in the 1996 Games in Atlanta, where they were hosts.Rexrode, Joe. "With Fab Five , U.S. gymnasts pick Fierce Five". usatoday.com. June 9, 2012. Retrieved August 14, 2012. Douglas was the only gymnast on the team to compete on all four apparatus (vault, uneven bars, balance beam, and floor exercise) during the finals of the team competition. She then won the gold medal in the individual all-around, becoming the first African-American woman, as well as the first woman of color of any nationality, to win the event. She also became the fourth American woman to win Olympic all-around gold as well as the third straight to do so (after Mary Lou Retton in Los Angeles in 1984, Carly Patterson in Athens in 2004 and Nastia Liukin in Beijing in 2008, all of whom were at the venue and watched Douglas equal their feat.) She also became the first American gymnast ever to win both the team and individual all-around gold at the same Olympics.

Douglas finished eighth in uneven bars, and seventh in balance beam. She is the first all-around champion to fail to medal in an individual event since women's gymnastics was added to the Olympics in 1952.

2013–2014
In August 2013, Douglas left Missy Parton's home, and moved to Los Angeles to be with her family. Although she was no longer training with Chow, she said that she was still preparing to compete in the 2016 Olympics.

In mid-April 2014, Douglas returned to Iowa to train once more with Coach Chow, in an attempt to qualify for the 2016 Olympics in Rio.  Chow and his wife were delighted to have Douglas return to the Iowa gym, which they had not expected she would after her departure to Los Angeles in summer 2013. At that time they were also training promising junior Norah Flatley, who many considered similar to both Douglas and Shawn Johnson in performance style.

In mid-July, it was announced that Douglas had once again left Chow's Gymnastics & Dance Institute.  She remained in the market for a new coach until the beginning of August, when news broke that Douglas would train under Kittia Carpenter at Buckeye Gymnastics in Genoa Township, Ohio. Nia Dennis, national team member, also trained at Buckeye at the time.  Carpenter announced that Douglas would not aim to return to competition at the 2014 national championships, as previously planned, but would instead train with a goal of returning in time for Worlds 2015.  The stated reasoning for Douglas's delay is that she wishes to return as strong as – or stronger than – when she left.  National Team Coordinator Marta Karolyi, who expressed satisfaction and some surprise with Douglas's physical condition at her first two national team training camps back (while she was once again working with Chow), commented on Douglas's planned comeback in Ohio, "My wish is that she will be consistent in her training. And if that's what she will do, I think she will be fine. But if she jumps up and down and left and right, it will be much harder."

After participating in several national team camps in 2014, on November 25, 2014, Douglas was added back to the U.S. national team, along with Olympic teammate Aly Raisman and former Chow's Gymnastics teammate Rachel Gowey.

2015
In March 2015, Douglas returned to international competition at the 2015 City of Jesolo Trophy in Jesolo, Italy. Douglas helped the USA win gold in the team competition and also placed 4th all-around behind defending World Champion Simone Biles, newcomer Bailie Key, and Olympic teammate Aly Raisman.

In July, Douglas competed at the U.S. Classic and finished second in the all-around behind 2-time World All-Around Champion Simone Biles and ahead of Maggie Nichols with a score of 60.500. She had a consistent night hitting clean routines. She placed second on uneven bars behind Madison Kocian and ahead of Bailie Key with a score of 15.400, third on balance beam behind Biles and Olympic teammate Aly Raisman with a score of 14.900, and second on floor exercise behind Biles and ahead of Key and Nichols with a score of 15.000.

On August 13 & 15, Douglas competed at the P&G Championships Indianapolis, Indiana, where she placed 5th overall with a score of 117.950, placing behind Simone Biles, Maggie Nichols, Aly Raisman, and Bailie Key.

Douglas started Night 1 on vault and despite a hop backwards on her double-twisting Yurchenko vault, she scored a 15.150. On bars, she had a high-flying piked Tkachev connected to her Pak Salto and had an excellent landing on her double layout dismount. She scored a 15.300 on bars. On beam, she had a shaky routine with balance checks but did score a 14.450. On floor, she had bad wobbles on her double Y-turn and her double turn with leg at horizontal (then didn't connect to her single turn with leg at horizontal). She had low landings and almost fell on her tucked full-in and scored a 13.850 to end Night 1 in 3rd with a total all-around score of 58.700.

On Night 2, Douglas started on bars where she excelled once again on her inbar-stalder pirouettes and her piked Tkachev-Pak Salto connection but she took a large step forward on her double layout dismount and almost fell. She scored a 15.100. Her total bars score of 30.400 placed her 4th on the event behind Madison Kocian, Ashton Locklear and Key (by 0.100). On beam, she had a shaky routine, with multiple balance checks and some lost connections, as well as a hop and low landing on her double pike dismount. She scored 14.200 on the event for a two-day total of 28.650, placing 9th on the event and scoring .050 behind Raisman and Mykayla Skinner. On floor, she improved her turns and connections and had better landings on her tumbling passes. She scored a 14.800 and totaled her score to 28.650, placing her 6th on the event.

Douglas was named to the Senior National Team for the first time since 2012 and received an invite to the 2015 Worlds Selection Camp in September. On October 8, 2015, it was announced that Douglas had been selected as a member of the 2015 US Women's World Championship team.

At the 2015 World Artistic Gymnastics Championships in Glasgow, Scotland, Douglas shared in the team gold medal won by the U.S.  She also qualified for the individual all-around in 3rd place, and to the uneven bars final in 6th place.  Douglas won the silver in the all-around, becoming the first reigning Olympic all-around champion since 2001 to return to the sport and win a world championships medal.

On November 13, 2015, The Columbus Dispatch revealed that Douglas would participate in the 2016 AT&T American Cup, in Newark, New Jersey. It was confirmed on December 17, 2015.

 2016 

In March 2016, following her win at the 2016 AT&T American Cup, Douglas participated at the 2016 City of Jesolo Trophy, where she won the all-around title.

Douglas competed at the 2016 Secret US Classic in Hartford, Connecticut, on June 4. She did not compete in the all-around competition, which was won by Fierce Five teammate Aly Raisman. Douglas competed on UB and BB, scoring a 15.650 on UB to finish in 3rd behind Ashton Locklear and Madison Kocian on that event. On the balance beam, she scored a 14.550. This meant her all-around total was 30.200.

On June 24 and 26, Douglas competed at the P&G Championships in St. Louis, Missouri. On Night 1, she scored a 14.800 on vault, a 15.100 on uneven bars, a 14.200 on balance beam, and a 14.800 on floor exercise. On Night 2, she scored a 14.900 on vault, a 14.500 on uneven bars, a 15.050 on balance beam, and a 14.450 on floor exercise. Her grand total was 117.800 for both nights, putting her in fourth all-around.

On July 10, Douglas was named to the team for the 2016 Olympics, alongside Simone Biles, Laurie Hernandez, Madison Kocian, and Aly Raisman. She and Raisman became part of a select group of American gymnasts including Miller and Dawes to compete in two Olympics.

On July 11, Mattel, Inc. released a "Gymnast Barbie" doll modeled after Douglas.

2016 Summer Olympics

On August 7, Douglas competed in the Women's Qualification at the 2016 Summer Olympics at the HSBC Arena (Arena Olimpica de Rio) in Rio de Janeiro. She scored a 15.166 on the vault, a 15.766 on the uneven bars, a 14.833 on the balance beam, and a 14.366 on the floor exercise. Along with the team final, she individually qualified into the uneven bars final. Douglas narrowly missed advancing to the all-around final to defend her title despite tallying the third-highest score in the preliminaries, since she was outscored by teammates Biles and Raisman and rules only allow two competitors from one NOC, similar to Wieber four years ago in London. Douglas also changed coaches during the competition, but kept her assistant coach.

Douglas helped the United States win a second consecutive gold medal in the team event, which was also her third Olympic gold medal. When the team final scores were announced, Douglas and her teammates called themselves the "Final Five" in honor of coach Marta Karolyi's retirement and the team size being reduced to four beginning in 2020.

Douglas finished seventh in the uneven bars event final.

 2022–present: comeback 
In October 2022 several gymnastics media outlets, such as The Gymternet and Gymcastic, reported that Douglas had recently returned to training, this time at WOGA. In November 2022 a photograph was posted online that showed Douglas in the gym with other current WOGA athletes, further strengthening rumors of a possible comeback.

In February 2023, WOGA coach Valeri Liukin confirmed to NBC that Douglas has been training at his gym.

Awards and honors

In December 2012, the Associated Press named Douglas the Female Athlete of the Year. She became the fourth gymnast to receive the honor.

Douglas was a nominee for the Laureus World Sports Award for Breakthrough of the Year. In June 2013, Douglas received two BET Awards for her accomplishments.

In the media
In July 2012, Douglas and her teammates were featured on the cover of Sports Illustrated Olympic Preview issue, the first time an entire Olympic gymnastics team had been featured on the cover of the magazine. On July 20, Douglas was on one of five Time magazine Olympic covers.

On August 3, the Kellogg Company announced that it would put a picture of Douglas standing on the podium with her gold medal on special-edition boxes of corn flakes, breaking the tradition of Olympic athletes appearing on Wheaties boxes.

On August 23, Douglas threw the ceremonial pitch at Citi Field when the Colorado Rockies played the New York Mets.
 
On August 26, Douglas spoke about racist bullying at Excalibur Gymnastics in an interview with Oprah Winfrey and how it nearly made her quit the sport. She described an incident in which she had heard other girls at the gym say, "Why doesn't Gabby do it? She's our slave", when chalk was needed to be scraped off the bars. The CEO of Excalibur Gymnastics, Gustavo Maure, denied these claims.

In September 2012, Nintendo announced that Douglas would be part of a new ad campaign for New Super Mario Bros. 2. On September 4, Douglas led the Pledge of Allegiance at the 2012 Democratic National Convention in Charlotte, North Carolina.

In December 2012, Douglas released her autobiography, Grace, Gold, and Glory: My Leap of Faith. The book debuted at number four on The New York Times Young Adult Bestseller List. That same month, she performed a miniature floor routine at the 2012 MTV Video Music Awards as part of the live performance by Alicia Keys and Nicki Minaj of the Girl on Fire Inferno Remix – following Douglas' success in London, Minaj had opted to end her verse with a reference to her: "I ain't tryna be that / Haters wanna see that / But I got 'em aggy / 'Cause I win the gold like Gabby."

Douglas had a small acting role on the Disney XD series Kickin It in the episode "Gabby's Gold", which aired on August 12, 2013.
 The Gabby Douglas Story aired on Lifetime on February 1, 2014, starring Imani Hakim. Douglas performed all the gymnastic stunts herself. In 2015, it was announced that a reality television show for the Oxygen channel had been commissioned to follow Douglas and her family's life, issued under the working title Douglas Family Gold. The show premiered on May 25, 2016.Gabrielle Douglas Reality TV Show Coming Soon. Christianpost.com (April 8, 2015). Retrieved on August 8, 2016. On August 23, 2016, it was announced that Douglas would be one of the judges at the 2017 Miss America pageant.

In 2017, after a 60 Minutes interview with Olympic gold medalist Aly Raisman who said that Larry Nassar, a former doctor for USA Gymnastics, had sexually abused (molested) her when she was 15 years old, Douglas sent a tweet saying that "dressing in a provocative/sexual way incites the wrong crowd." She was criticized for it by fellow Olympic teammate Simone Biles and others, who interpreted the tweet as criticism of Raisman and "victim-shaming". Douglas later apologized for the tweet and said she was also a victim of Nassar's sexual abuse.

Douglas appeared disguised as a gray-haired, aspiring gym owner in a "Celebrity Edition" episode of Undercover Boss that first aired on May 11, 2018.

Gymnastic equipment used by Douglas at the 2012 Summer Olympics is at the National Museum of African American History and Culture.

In 2020, Douglas competed on The Masked Singer spin-off The Masked Dancer as "Cotton Candy" and was declared the winner of the season.

She is set to guest star as herself with Dominique Dawes and Laurie Hernandez in the episode "A Perfect 10" of the second season of the Disney+ animated series The Proud Family: Louder and Prouder'', judging a gymnastics competition.

Selected competitive skills
Douglas is most well known for her high-flying release skills on the uneven bars (hence her nickname "The Flying Squirrel"), her resilient demeanor, and her upbeat floor exercise routines. The following routines are those that were performed by Douglas at either an Olympic or a World Championships competition.

Books

 
 Douglas, Gabrielle (2013). Raising The Bar. Zondervan. 144 pp.

Competitive history

See also

List of Olympic female gymnasts for the United States

References

External links

 
 
 
 
 
 

1995 births
Living people
21st-century American non-fiction writers
21st-century American women writers
21st-century Christians
African-American Christians
African-American female gymnasts
African-American women writers
African-American writers
American autobiographers
American female artistic gymnasts
American non-fiction writers
Christians from Virginia
Gymnasts at the 2012 Summer Olympics
Gymnasts at the 2016 Summer Olympics
Medalists at the 2012 Summer Olympics
Medalists at the 2016 Summer Olympics
Medalists at the World Artistic Gymnastics Championships
Olympic gold medalists for the United States in gymnastics
Participants in American reality television series
Sportspeople from Ventura County, California
Sportspeople from Virginia Beach, Virginia
U.S. women's national team gymnasts
Women autobiographers
Writers from Virginia
American women non-fiction writers
21st-century African-American women